Crack: Cocaine, Corruption & Conspiracy is a 2021 American documentary film made for Netflix and directed by Stanley Nelson. Its story focuses on the emergence and effects of the 1980s crack epidemic in the United States, which resulted in negative effects on America's inner cities. The film was released on January 11, 2021.

References

External links 

2021 documentary films
2021 films
American documentary films
Documentaries about crime in the United States
Documentary films about drugs
2020s English-language films
2020s American films